Joseph Erwin Just (born Joseph Erwin Juszczak) (January 8, 1916 – November 22, 2003) was a Major League Baseball catcher who broke into the Major Leagues on May 13, 1944, with the Cincinnati Reds of the National League. Just appeared in 25 games over two years with the Reds during World War II and returned to the minor leagues when the majority of players returned from military service.

External links

Baseball Almanac

1916 births
2003 deaths
Cincinnati Reds players
Major League Baseball catchers
Baseball players from Milwaukee
Milwaukee Brewers (minor league) players
Elmira Pioneers players
Birmingham Barons players
Syracuse Chiefs players
Tulsa Oilers (baseball) players
Baltimore Orioles (IL) players
Fieldale Towlers players